The Callide Valley railway line ran from Rannes to Lawgi in Queensland, Australia. The Callide Valley lies to the south-west of Rockhampton in Central Queensland.

History

There were grand plans to link Monto by railway with the south, east and north. Links with Maryborough to the south and Gladstone to the east materialised but the northern link terminated at Lawgi some 70 kilometres away. Rannes was already linked by rail to Rockhampton by the Dawson Valley railway line via Mount Morgan and a branch line from Rannes to Lawgi provided access to the rich Callide Valley and justified its construction.

Opening
The first stage commenced from Rannes, heading south-east to Callide (originally called Callidi) and opened on 3 May 1924. Stops en route were Jooro, Goovigen, Jambin and Argoon. A mixed train ran twice a week from Baralaba, west of Rannes on the Dawson Valley branch, to Callide and connected at Rannes with a service northeast to Rockhampton. A 22 kilometre extension was opened on 24 August 1925 south from Callide via Biloela to Thangool which at the time was the main township between Rannes and Monto.

Train services
A mixed service took 7  hours for the journey from Thangool to Mount Morgan and a later passenger service took 6 hours from Thangool to Rockhampton. The terminus at Thangool was intended to be temporary and trucking yards were not constructed. However, facilities were provided at Biloela siding and it quickly became the major centre of the district.

Later stages
Construction beyond Thangool was halted in August 1926 and resumed during the depression as an employment measure. The third and final stage took the line a further 14 kilometres via Mount Scoria to Lawgi. Proposed construction to Monto did not eventuate and isolated Lawgi became the terminus on 19 September 1932. The Lawgi station mistress was withdrawn in 1952 and the section to Thangool was closed on 1 July 1955. The Thangool to Biloela section closed on 31 January 1988 and Biloela became the railhead. The line between Biloela and Lawgi was taken up. It remains in place between Rannes and Biloela, though only the section between Dakenba and Earlsfield is in service.

A 1939 map shows the proposed railway beyond Lawgi with the following planned railway stations:

 Mount Lookerbie 
 Yaparaba
 Dawes

Timeline
 Rannes-Callide, 46 km, opened 3 May 1924
 Callide-Biloela-Thangool, 22 km, opened 24 August 1925
 Thangool-Lawgi, 14 km, opened 19 September 1932
 Dakenba-Callide Coalfields branch, 15 km, opened 9 November 1953
 Lawgi-Thangool closed 1 July 1955
 Thangool-Biloela, 11 km, closed 31 January 1988
 Biloela-Dakenba currently out of service
 Callide Coalfields-Dakenba-Earlsfield (junction with the Moura Short Line) in active service for coal traffic
 Koorngoo-Rannes, 24 km, closed ~1999
 Earlsfield-Koorngoo available for seasonal grain haulage

Moura Short Line
In 1968 the Moura Short Line was opened to transport coal from the Callide and Moura mines to Gladstone port. The line crosses the Callide branch line between Jambin and Callide at Earlsfield Junction and thus links Biloela with Gladstone in lieu of its previous link to Rockhampton.

Route

See also
 Gladstone to Monto railway line
 Mungar Junction to Monto Branch Railway
 Rail transport in Queensland

References 

Works cited
 "Triumph of Narrow Gauge: A History of Queensland Railways" by John Kerr 1990 Boolarong Press, Brisbane

External links 
 YouTube video "Four locos into the Callide Valley"
 YouTube video "Callide Valley Down Hill"

Railway lines in Queensland
Railway lines opened in 1924
1924 establishments in Australia
Buildings and structures in Central Queensland